Summit is an unincorporated community and census-designated place in Benton County, Oregon, United States. At the 2010 census, it had a population of 82. Summit lies on Oregon Route 180 northwest of Blodgett.

Since 1980 – at last in 2019
– Summit is known locally for its small Summit Summer Festival on the third Saturday in August. At the Hippie-style gathering with food and music artisans offer their products, e.g. hand made knives, quilts; artists make their shows e.g. big soap bubbles and visitors get involved.

Demographics

External links 

 Summit Summer Festival 2012 – lunadancer1969, youtube.com, August 21, 2012, video (4:24)

References 

Unincorporated communities in Benton County, Oregon
Census-designated places in Oregon
Unincorporated communities in Oregon